The Fujifilm FinePix Z33WP is a waterproof digital camera produced by Fujifilm.

External links
FinePix Z33WP | Fujifilm Global

Z33WP